Louise Archer (born 1973) is Karl Mannheim Professor of Sociology of Education at the University College London Institute of Education.

On 12 October 2017 she was elected a Fellow of the Academy of Social Sciences.

References

External links

Academics of University College London
British women academics
Living people
1973 births
Fellows of the Academy of Social Sciences